The seventh series of The Only Way Is Essex, a British semi-reality television programme, began airing on 30 September 2012 on ITV2. The series concluded on 31 October 2012 after ten episodes. Following the series, three festive special episodes aired from 2 December to 19 December 2012, including one live episode. The Only Way Is Essexmas special episode is included on the Series 7 DVD and Britbox, however for unknown reasons the other two specials were aren't on this DVD. This was the first series to include brand new cast members and siblings Jasmin and Danny Walia. Jasmin had previously appeared during the Essexmas special of the first series auditioning for girl band LOLA.

This series also featured the return of original cast member Kirk Norcross following his departure at the end of the third series, as well as Mark Wright, who returned for the Essexmas special. The series also featured many cast departures including Cara and Tom Kilbey, and Lydia Bright. McFly band member Tom Fletcher also made a cameo appearance during this series when his brother-in-law Mario Falcone visited him seeking advice. This series heavily focused on the on/off relationship between Arg, and realising there's no way back for them, he launches a rescue mission for his PlayStation and his Kenny Award from her flat. It also includes the turbulent relationships of Jess and Ricky, Joey and Sam as well as Lucy and Mario whom eventually call their engagement off.

Cast

Episodes

{| class="wikitable plainrowheaders" style="width:100%; background:#fff;"
|-style="color:white"
! style="background:#A1CAF1;"| SeriesNo.
! style="background:#A1CAF1;"| EpisodeNo.
! style="background:#A1CAF1;"| Title
! style="background:#A1CAF1;"| Original airdate
! style="background:#A1CAF1;"| Duration
! style="background:#A1CAF1;"| UK viewers

|}

Reception

Ratings

References

The Only Way Is Essex
2012 in British television
2012 British television seasons